The men's 440 yards at the 1962 British Empire and Commonwealth Games as part of the athletics programme was held at the Perry Lakes Stadium on Monday 26 November and Thursday 29 November 1962.

33 runners competed in six heats in the initial round, with the top two runners from each heat qualifying for the semifinals. There were two semifinals, and only the top three from each heat advanced to the final.

The event was won by Jamaica George Kerr in 46.7 seconds, who also won silver 880 yards earlier in the meet. Kerr finished 0.1 seconds ahead of Englishman Robbie Brightwell and Amos Omolo from Uganda who won bronze. Kerr's winning time in the final set a new Australian all comers record. One of England's finalist hopes Barry Jackson suffered a muscle injury 15 yards from the finish in the second semi final and unable to complete the race.

Records

Round 1

Heat 1

Heat 2

Heat 3

Heat 4

Heat 5

Heat 6

Semifinals

Semifinal 1
.

Semifinal 2

Final

References

Men's 440 yards
1962